Rhynchonella is an extinct genus of brachiopod found in Ordovician to Eocene strata worldwide. It was a stationary epifaunal suspension feeder.

Description
These 1.75 to 3.75 cm long articulate brachiopods are characterized by a triangular shell with a spherical profile, powerful ribs, a curved hinge line and a small umbo. The anterior margin shows a tongue like projection.

Species
Rhynchonella acuminata † Martin 1809
Rhynchonella adrianensis † Gemmellaro 1899
Rhynchonella boloniensis † (d'Orbigny, 1850) 
Rhynchonella carapezzae † Gemmellaro 1899
Rhynchonella carinthiaca † Bittner 1890
Rhynchonella confinensis † Schellwien 1892
Rhynchonella djeffarae † Dubar 1967
Rhynchonella edwardsi † Chapuis & Dewalque 1853
Rhynchonella eskiordensis † Moisseiev 1932
Rhynchonella fraasi † Oppel 1861
Rhynchonella granulum † Eichwald 1860
Rhynchonella inflata † Jaboli 1959
Rhynchonella jukesi † McCoy 1847
Rhynchonella kochigataniensis † Tokuyama 1957
Rhynchonella krotovi † Tschemyschew 1902
Rhynchonella lacuna † Quenstedt 1871
Rhynchonella langleti † Chapuis & Dewalque 1853
Rhynchonella limbata † Schlotheim 1813
Rhynchonella lingulata † Gabb 1864
Rhynchonella loxia † Fischer von Waldheim 1809
Rhynchonella maudensis † Whiteaves 1884
Rhynchonella minuta † Buvignier 1843
Rhynchonella miquihuanensis † Imlay 1937
Rhynchonella misella † Bittner 1890
Rhynchonella negrii † Gemmellaro 1899
Rhynchonella paolii † Canavari 1880
Rhynchonella paucicosta † Kitchin 1910
Rhynchonella pauciplicata † Kitchin 1900
Rhynchonella prona † Oppel 1861
Rhynchonella pseudoazaisi † Dubar 1967
Rhynchonella pugnus † Martin
Rhynchonella pupula † Bittner 1890
Rhynchonella salinasi † Gemmellaro 1899
Rhynchonella sosiensis † Gemmellaro 1899
Rhynchonella subrimosa † Schafhauti 1851
Rhynchonella tazerdunensis † Dubar 1967
Rhynchonella texanus † Shumard 1859
Rhynchonella wichmanni † Rothpletz 1892
Rhynchonella withei † Gemmellaro 1899

References 

Frank H.T. Rodes, Herbert S. Zim en Paul R. Shaffer (1993) - Natuurgids Fossielen (het ontstaan, prepareren en rangschikken van fossielen), Zuidnederlandse Uitgeverij N.V., Aartselaar. ISBN D-1993-0001-361

Prehistoric brachiopod genera
Llandovery first appearances
Eocene genus extinctions
Rhynchonellida
Paleozoic life of Ontario